The Anauá National Forest is a national forest in the state of Roraima, Brazil.

Overview
The creation of the national forest was an initiative of the citizens of Rorainópolis in cooperation with the local logging association to create a protected area with sustainable land use. In 2005, the national forest was created and is managed by the Chico Mendes Institute for Biodiversity Conservation. The forest is located in the municipality of Rorainópolis.

The name refers to the Anauá River which is a tributary of the Branco River. In the Tupi language Anauá translates to flowering tree.

The Anauá National Forest is a densely forested rainforest influenced by several tributaries of the Branco River. A threat to the forest are the activities of illegal loggers.

References

National forests of Brazil
Protected areas of Roraima
2005 establishments in Brazil
Protected areas established in 2005